Ctenomeristis albata is a species of snout moth in the genus Ctenomeristis. It was described by Marianne Horak in 1998, and is known from Papua New Guinea and Queensland, Australia.

References

Moths described in 1998
Phycitini
Moths of Australia
Moths of Papua New Guinea
Taxa named by Marianne Horak